Colegiul Naţional Mihai Eminescu ('Mihai Eminescu' National College) is a high school in Bucharest, Romania.  It bears the name of Mihai Eminescu, Romania's  best-known poet. In 2000, it was granted the title of National College by the Ministry of Education and Research of Romania.

Notable faculty include Constantin Noe.

High schools in Bucharest
National Colleges in Romania